Ferques is a commune in the Pas-de-Calais department in the Hauts-de-France region of France.

Geography
Le Haut-Banc station has rail connections to Calais and Boulogne-sur-Mer.

Population

Places of interest
 The church of the Assumption, dating from the nineteenth century.
 Ruins of a monastery chapel.
 A Merovingian cemetery.

See also
Communes of the Pas-de-Calais department

References

External links

 Official Web site 
 The history of Ferques 

Communes of Pas-de-Calais